Elections in Gabon take place within the framework of a presidential multi-party democracy with the Gabonese Democratic Party, in power since independence, as the dominant party. The President and National Assembly are directly elected, whilst the Senate is indirectly elected.

Electoral history

Pre-independence
Following World War II, Gabon (in a combined constituency with French Congo, began to elect members to the French National Assembly. The first elections took place in October 1945, with voters split into two colleges; the First College for French citizens and the Second for non-citizens. Gabriel d'Arboussier was elected by the First College, and although Gabonese politician Jean-Hilaire Aubame received the most votes in the Second College, the election went to a second round, where he was beaten by the Congolese Jean-Félix Tchicaya. The next elections were held in June the following year, with d'Arboussier defeated by Henri Seignon in the First College and Tchicaya re-elected in the Second. Another election was held in November that year, with the Second College gaining an extra seat, and now split into Congolese and Gabonese sections. Maurice Bayrou was elected by the still-combined First College, whilst Aubame was elected in the Gabonese Second College seat on a French Section of the Workers' International ticket.

A third election in 1946 took place in December when the Representative Assembly was elected; it also used a college system, with 12 members elected by the First College and 18 by the Second. The next French elections took place in 1951, with Bayrou re-elected in the First College and Aubame in the Second. The Representative Council was converted into a Territorial Assembly prior to the 1952 elections, with Aubame's Gabonese Democratic and Social Union (UDSG) winning 14 of the 24 seats. Bayrou and Aubame were both re-elected again in the 1956 French elections.

The final national elections in the colonial period were the Territorial Assembly elections of 1957. Although the UDSG emerged as the largest party, winning 14 of the 40 seats, the Gabonese Democratic Bloc (BDG), which had won eight seats, was able to form a 21-seat coalition together with an affiliated list and five independents. This resulted in the BDG's Léon M'ba becoming Prime Minister, and President when the country became independent in 1960.

Post-independence
Following independence, the President became a directly elected post, with the National Assembly elected every three years and the President every six. In the first post-independence elections in 1961 both posts were elected simultaneously, and the BDG and UDSG agreed to run on a single united list under the name "National Union". No other party ran and the list won all 67 seats in the National Assembly, whilst M'ba ran unopposed for the presidency, and was elected with 100% of the vote. However, the two parties ran against each other in the 1964 parliamentary elections, with the BDG winning 31 seats to the UDSG's 16. The BDG was the only party to contest the 1967 general elections, resulting in M'ba being re-elected unopposed and the party winning all 47 seats in the National Assembly.

The following year the country became a one-party state with the Gabonese Democratic Party (PDG, the successor to the BDG) as the sole legal party. General elections were held in 1969, with Omar Bongo (who had succeeded M'ba after his death in 1967) elected unopposed as President and the PDG list winning all 70 seats in the National Assembly. Presidential elections in 1979 and 1986 saw Bongo re-elected in the same manner, whilst the PDG remained unopposed in parliamentary elections in 1980 (in which the National Assembly was increased to 89 seats) and 1985 (111 seats).

Multi-party politics was reintroduced in 1990 and parliamentary elections that year saw the PDG retain its majority in the National Assembly, although it was reduced to 63 of the 120 seats. The first competitive presidential elections were held in 1993, with Bongo re-elected with 51% of the vote, although the runner-up, Paul Mba Abessole, accused the government of vote rigging. The PDG won the 1996 parliamentary elections, winning 85 seats. The Senate was elected for the first time in early 1997, with the PDG winning 52 of the 91 seats. Bongo was re-elected again in 1998 with 67% of the vote, and the PDG gained another seat in the 2001 parliamentary elections. The February 2003 Senate elections saw the PDG win 67 of the 92 seats. Bongo was re-elected for a sixth time in the 2005 presidential elections with 79% of the vote.

The PDG was reduced to 82 seats in the 2006 parliamentary elections, although affiliated parties won a further 17 seats. Senate elections in early 2009 saw the PDG win 75 of the 102 seats in an expanded Senate. Following Bongo's death in June 2009, presidential elections were held later in the year, and won by his son Ali Bongo Ondimba, who received 42% of the vote. The 2011 parliamentary elections were boycotted by most opposition parties, resulting in the PDG winning 115 of the 121 seats. The PDG retained its majority in the Senate in the 2014 elections, winning 81 seats.

Electoral system
The voting age in Gabon is 21, and voting is compulsory; non-participants may be fined.

President
The President of Gabon is elected for a seven-year term in a single round of voting by plurality.

National Assembly
The 120 members of the National Assembly are elected from nine multi-member constituencies based on the provinces using the two-round system. Constituencies are between nine and eighteen seats in size.

Senate
The 102 members of the Senate are indirectly elected. Like the National Assembly, they are elected from nine multi-member constituencies based on the provinces, with between four and eighteen seats in each constituency. The elections are carried out by municipal councillors and departmental assembly members using the two-round system. Substitute members are elected at the same time.

Referendums
During the colonial era, Gabonese voters participated in French constitutional referendums in 1945, May 1946 and October 1946. In the 1958 referendum on establishing the French Community, 93% of voters voted in favour; a no vote would have resulted in immediate independence. Since independence in 1960, only one referendum has been held; a constitutional referendum in 1995, which saw amendments to the constitution approved by 96.5% of voters.

References

External links
Gabon Adam Carr's Election Archive
Elections in Gabon African Elections Database